Rawandiz is a city in the Kurdistan Region of Iraq, located in the Erbil Governorate, close to the borders with Iran and Turkey, it is located 10 km to the east from Bekhal Waterfall. The district is 123 km from Erbil. The district is surrounded by the Zagros mountain range; Korek Mountain is to the south, Hindren Mountain to the north, Zozik Mountain to the west, and Bradasot Mountain to the east. The city is populated by the Kurds .

Etymology
The name 'Rawandiz' derives from the name of the Rawandiz (Rawadiya) Kurdish tribe, of which Saladin and the Ayyubids originated. The tribe's name is a corruption of the Old Persian root, Erwend 'a pass,' and which was usually Hellenized into Orodes and Orontes. The tribe was itself a branch of the Hadhabani confederation.

History

In the time of the Neo Assyrian Empire, from the 10th to the 7th centuries BC, the area lay on the trading route to Nineveh.

The area came under the rule of the Emirate of Bradost after the Battle of Chaldiran in 1514. The town would later come under the rule of the Soran Emirate until 1836.

In 1915, during the First World War, the town was occupied by the Russians and Assyrians. The Rawandiz massacre took place, where the Kurdish Muslim population was massacred by the Russian army and allied Assyrian militants; after Nikolai Baratov's Cossacks recaptured the town, only 20 percent of the Kurdish population managed to survive. In 1922 the town was occupied by the Turks, until they were driven out at the end of the year. The British army occupied the town on 22 April 1923. The British decided to stay in place to await the arrival of a special commission to fix the border between Turkey and Iraq, believing that if they left the Turkish troops would return.

Between 1928 and 1932 the British built a strategic road from Erbil, through Rawandiz, to the Iranian border near modern-day Piranshahr. The construction of the road was directed by the New Zealand engineer A. M. Hamilton. In 1940, the population was 1970.

As of July 2007, Rawandiz was undergoing major reconstruction. The bazaar was being relocated to make room for a new road. In July 2011, in a response to a Turkish military offensive, local artists decided to paint the debris from the raids. In 1930, A. M. Hamilton noted: "it has always been a place of grim deeds and bloody retributions. Its greater and its lesser rulers alike have nearly all met with violent deaths and even today this reputation is being well earned". The anthropologist Edmund Leach went to Rawandiz in 1938, to study the Rawandiz Kurds, intending to make this the subject of his thesis. His field trip had to be aborted because of the Munich crisis, but he nevertheless published his monograph "Social and Economic Organization of the Rowanduz Kurds " two years later.

Climate
Like most of Iraqi Kurdistan, Rawanduz has a hot-summer Mediterranean climate (Csa) with very hot dry summers and cool, wet winters. The winters see lows below freezing in many nights, making frost prevalent. Snowfall occurs occasionally.

Tourism
The striking scenery has been noted by a number of visitors to the region. A. M. Hamilton relates that the Rawanduz gorge was said to be the finest in Asia.

The Pank Tourist Resort, which was opened in 2007,  it was the first such resort in Iraq. It includes a Ferris wheel and other rides, including a toboggan and Bobsled. Also includes a five-star hotel, restaurants, swimming pools, saunas, tennis courts, helipads and mini golf. Mount Korek is one of the top 10 destinations to visit in the Kurdistan region of Iraq, there is a 4 kilometer long Doppelmayr Teleferic (cable car) from its Bekhal Bottom station to Mount Korek. The mountain is developed as an international destination. The Resort has developed 132 villas and several rides in his project which is called "The Korek Mountain Resort & Spa". There are also restaurants, cafes and helipads. The resort is a summer retreat providing cool environs when the whole region reels under high temperatures. During winters, it turns into a Ski Resort.

Gallery

References

 
Cities in Iraqi Kurdistan
Kurdish settlements in Iraq
Populated places in Erbil Governorate